The commemorative coins of Czechoslovakia were minted by the State Bank of Czechoslovakia. They were legal tender not only in Czechoslovakia but in 1993–2000 in the Czech Republic too.

Czechoslovak Socialist Republic (1948–1989)
 10 Kčs and 25 Kčs, silver, 10th anniversary of Slovak National Uprising, 1954
 10 Kčs, 25 Kčs, 50 Kčs and 100 Kčs, silver, 10th anniversary of liberation of Czechoslovakia by Soviet army, 1955

Czech and Slovak Federative Republic (1989–1992)
 100 Kčs, silver, 100th anniversary of Velká pardubická horse race, 1990
 50 Kčs, silver, 1st anniversary of canonization of Saint Agnes of Bohemia, 1990
 100 Kčs, silver, 100th anniversary of birth of Bohuslav Martinů, 1990
 50 Kčs, silver, 150th anniversary of the run of the first Czech steamship Bohemia, 1991
 100 Kčs, silver, 100th anniversary of birth of Antonín Dvořák, 1991
 100 Kčs, silver, Estates Theatre in Prague newly opened, 200th anniversary of death of Wolfgang Amadeus Mozart, 1991
 50 Kčs, silver, Karlovy Vary, Mariánské Lázně and Piešťany Spas, 1991
 500 Kčs, silver, 400th anniversary of birth of Jan Ámos Komenský, 1992
 100 Kčs, silver, 50th anniversary of Lidice and Ležáky destruction, 1992
 100 Kčs, silver, 175th anniversary of establishment of Moravia Land Museum (Moravské zemské muzeum) in Brno, 1992
 500 Kčs, silver, 100th anniversary of Czechoslovak tennis, 1992
 100 Kčs, silver, 1000th anniversary of establishment of Břevnov Monastery, 1992
 100 Kčs, silver, 100th anniversary of establishment od Slovak museal society (Muzeálna slovenská spoločnosť)

See also

 Commemorative coins of the Czech Republic
 Commemorative coins of Slovakia

Czechoslovakia
Coins of Czechoslovakia